Callambulyx sinjaevi is a species of moth of the family Sphingidae. It is known from Shaanxi in China.

References

Callambulyx
Moths described in 2000